

Station List

U